The Czech Republic women's national under-18 ice hockey team is the national women's junior ice hockey team of the Czech Republic, which represents Czechia at the International Ice Hockey Federation's Ice Hockey U18 Women's World Championship and other international U18 competitions.

Women's World U18 Championship record
The Czech women's national under-18 ice hockey team is one of five teams to have participated in every Top Division tournament of the IIHF Ice Hockey U18 Women's World Championship since the event was inaugurated in 2008. They have won two World U18 Championship bronze medals, in 2008 and 2014.

Team

Current roster
Roster for the 2023 IIHF Ice Hockey U18 Women's World Championship.

Head coach: Dušan AndrašovskýAssistant coaches: Martin Pouska, Václav Vacek

See also 
 Czech Republic women's national ice hockey team

References 

Women's national under-18 ice hockey teams